Selenihalanaerobacter is a Gram-negative, obligately anaerobic and halophilic genus of bacteria from the family of Halobacteroidaceae with one known species (Selenihalanaerobacter shriftii). Selenihalanaerobacter shriftii has been isolated from the Dead Sea. Selenihalanaerobacter shriftii grows by respiration of selenate.

See also
 List of bacterial orders
 List of bacteria genera

References

Clostridia
Bacteria genera
Taxa described in 2001
Monotypic bacteria genera